Monster truck accident may refer to:

 Chihuahua monster truck accident
 Haaksbergen monster truck accident